Manuel Madrid Quezada (born 29 August 1993), known as Kaiser de Chihuahua, is a Mexican professional footballer who plays as a defender for USL League One side Chattanooga Red Wolves.

Club career

Phoenix Rising FC
Madrid signed with Phoenix Rising FC on July 15, 2021.

Chattanooga Red Wolves
On 1 February 2023, Madrid signed with USL League One side Chattanooga Red Wolves.

References

External links
 
 

Cruz Azul footballers
Phoenix Rising FC players
Chattanooga Red Wolves SC players
1993 births
Living people
Footballers from Chihuahua
Liga MX players
USL Championship players
Mexican footballers
Association football defenders
Ascenso MX players
Liga de Expansión MX players
Mexican expatriate footballers
Mexican expatriate sportspeople in the United States
Expatriate soccer players in the United States